Sarableh is a city in Ilam Province, Iran.

Sarableh or Sarabeleh or Sar Ableh may also refer to:
 Sarabeleh, Kermanshah
 Sarableh, Sarpol-e Zahab, Kermanshah Province